Peltospira is a genus of sea snails, marine gastropod mollusks in the family Peltospiridae.

Species
Species within the genus Peltospira include:

 Peltospira delicata McLean, 1989
 Peltospira lamellifera Warén & Bouchet, 1989
 Peltospira operculata McLean, 1989
 Peltospira smaragdina Warén & Bouchet, 2001

References

 McLean, J.H. (1989). New archaeogastropod limpets from hydrothermal vents: new family Peltospiridae, new superfamily Peltospiracea. Zoologica Scripta. 18(1): 49-66.

External links

Peltospiridae